Bundee Aki (born 7 April 1990) is a Samoan-New Zealander professional rugby union player who plays for Connacht in the URC and the Ireland national team. Aki was born and grew up in New Zealand, of Samoan descent, and qualified for Ireland through residency. A centre, he has also played for New Zealand provincial team Counties Manukau and for the Chiefs in Super Rugby.

Aki has won a Super Rugby title with the Chiefs and a Pro12 title with Connacht. For the 2015–16 season, he was named the league's player of the season. Aki was selected to represent the British and Irish Lions for their 2021 tour to South Africa.

Early life and education
Aki was born in the Auckland suburb of Otahuhu, to Hercules and Sautia Aki. He was named Fua Leiofi, but was called Bundellu after the doctor who delivered him. The nickname "Bundee" was given to him by a rugby coach at under-age level. Bundee was the second eldest of six children, with one brother and four sisters.

Aki grew up in Manurewa, a suburb in South Auckland, and attended Manurewa High School, where he played for the school's First XV rugby team. He took a year out from a professional rugby career in 2011, when he worked as a bank teller.

Club career

Career in Malaysia
Aki played for the Borneo Eagles based in Sabah, East Malaysia.

Career in New Zealand

Counties Manukau
Aki began playing for Counties Manukau in the 2011 season. He made nine appearances for the side with five of these coming as starts, scoring three tries as they finished fourth in the Championship Division of the 2011 ITM Cup. In the 2012 ITM Cup, he played 11 of the team's 12 games, starting on each occasion and scoring six tries. Counties Manukau finished top of the Championship Division and won their play-off games against Southland and Otago, which earned the side promotion to the following year's Premiership Division.

With Counties promoted to the Premiership Division, he played in all ten of their regular season games in the 2013 ITM Cup, starting eight of these, as the team qualified for the play-offs on their return to the top flight. He also started in the team's play-off semi-final, a 41–10 defeat to Wellington. Aki scored one try during the course of the season, with the score coming against Tasman in a 20–40 defeat.

2014 was Aki's final season with Counties, as it had been announced earlier in the year that he would be leaving New Zealand to join Irish side Connacht. He started all ten games as Counties fifth, two points outside the playoff places, in the 2014 ITM Cup, but did not score any points. Aki's final appearance for Counties Manukau came in the team's 41–18 victory over Auckland on 8 October 2014.

Chiefs
In September 2012, it was announced that Aki had signed for reigning Super Rugby champions the Chiefs, having been part of the side's development set up previously. Aki came into the team for the 2013 Super Rugby season. He played in 13 of the side's 18 regular season games, starting 12 of these and scoring five tries, as Chiefs finished top of the table. Aki also featured for the team in the play-offs coming off the bench after 48 minutes against Crusaders in the semi-final, and after 46 minutes in the final against the Brumbies as Chiefs won their second title in a row.

Aki played ten times for Chiefs in the regular season of the 2014 season, starting seven of these matches and scoring three tries. Chiefs finished sixth in the final standings of the league season, the final qualifying spot for the competition's play-off rounds. Aki started in the Chiefs' quarter-final game against the Brumbies, a replay of the previous year's final. Aki scored his fourth try of the season, but finished on the losing side as the Brumbies won the game by 32–30. This was Aki's final game for the Chiefs, as it had been announced earlier in the year that he would be moving to Irish side, Connacht.

Connacht
Aki signed for Connacht in April 2014 and moved to Ireland ahead of the 2014–15 season. This move made him the second Chiefs player in as many years to join Connacht, following the transfer of captain Craig Clarke the previous season.

He quickly became a key part of Connacht's setup, starting whenever fit and excelling on the pitch.

On 25 October 2016, Aki signed a new contract to remain at Connacht until 2020 and became eligible to play for Ireland after completing three years of residence in the country in October 2017.

In November 2019, he signed a fresh three-year extension to his central contract, to keep him with Connacht until the summer of 2023 at least, the first Connacht player to sign a central deal with the union. After signing, he declared: "I am truly grateful for the opportunity I have been given to represent both Connacht and Irish and am delighted to extend my IRFU contract (...) From the start of my Debut in the Irish jersey me and my family have had great support". His decision to extend his contract came after much media speculation about what his future may hold after a disappointing Rugby World Cup in Japan.

International career

Ireland call-up
Aki was qualified to play for New Zealand, where he was born and raised, and Samoa, the country of origin of his parents. However, after completing a three-year residency period, he became eligible to represent Ireland on the international stage.

On 26 October 2017, Aki was named in the extended Ireland squad for the Autumn internationals. His inclusion came at a time when a growing number of players were qualifying to play for a foreign nation based on the three-year residency rule, which sparked a huge debate about eligibility rules in rugby union.

Parts of the media stated that he had no real connection with Ireland, was getting in the way of Irish talent going through the ranks, and questioned loyalty issues should Aki decide to move abroad after his contract was over thus ending his international career. His selection was criticised by some former internationals, including Neil Francis and Luke Fitzgerald, who was generally critical of the residency rule, but supported by others including  Alan Quinlan Simon Easterby, and Chris Farrell. Other rugby figures, including Connor Murray, and former Ireland head coach Eddie O'Sullivan, whilst critical of the residency rule, felt it was unfair individual players such as Aki to be singled out for criticism. Aki acknowledged the criticism, admitting that a big part of his motivation to move to Ireland was to play international rugby, and noted that he hoped that he could do the country proud with his on-field performance.

Ireland career
Aki made his debut for Ireland in the 38–3 win against  at the Aviva Stadium on 11 November 2017, playing the full 80 minutes. Two weeks later he played against , again featuring for the entire match in a 28–19 win.

In the 2018 Six Nations, Aki was the only centre to feature in every game for Ireland as they won the Grand Slam. Injuries to centre partners Garry Ringrose, Robbie Henshaw and Chris Farrell meant that Aki started every match and was only replaced in the final game against  due to injury. He was also part of the team's end-of season tour of Australia, which saw Ireland win a test series against  for the first time since 1979.

Aki continued to be a regular starter for Ireland in the 2018–19 season. On 17 November 2018, he started against his native  in a 16–9 win. This was Ireland's first victory over the All Blacks on home soil. Aki also featured in all five of Ireland's games in the 2019 Six Nations, as they finished third in a disappointing defence of their Grand Slam title.

In September 2019, Aki was named in the Irish squad for the upcoming World Cup. He started Ireland's opening game against , but was removed after only 20 minutes in the 27–3 win due to a head injury. This injury caused him to miss the next game against Japan, which ended in a shock 19–12 defeat to leave Ireland in danger of elimination. Aki returned to the starting lineup for the following game against , and also started the final pool match against over  but was sent off in the 29th minute of the 47–5 win. The red card resulted in a three-game suspension, ruling Aki out of the remainder of the tournament. Ireland were eliminated in the next round, as New Zealand ran out 46–14 victors in the quarter-finals.

Aki was banned for four games after receiving a red card for a high tackle on Billy Vunipola in Ireland's 32–18 win against England 
in the 2021 Six Nations Championship on 20 March.

He was called up to be part of the Irish squad for the 2023 Six Nations Championship which went on to win their fourth Grand Slam.

British & Irish Lions
On 6 May 2021, Aki was named in the squad for the 2021 British & Irish Lions tour to South Africa.
He made his test debut on 7 August 2021 in the final test. South Africa won the final test 19–16 and the series by two games to one.

International tries

Personal life
Aki grew up and went to school with fellow Chiefs teammate Tim Nanai-Williams.

Aki has two children and frequently highlights the importance his family has to him. Aki lives in Renmore, a suburb of Galway city.

Honours

Chiefs Rugby
 2013 Super Rugby Winner with Chiefs

Connacht Rugby
 2015–16 Pro12 Winner with Connacht Rugby
 2015–16 Pro12 Player of The Season
 2015–16 Pro12 Dream Team

Ireland

Six Nations Championship:
Winner (2): 2018 2023
Grand Slam:
Winner (2): 2018, 2023
Triple Crown:
Winner (3): 2018, 2022, 2023

References

External links

Ireland Profile
Chiefs Profile
Counties Manukau Profile
EPCR Profile
Pro12 Profile
Ultimate Rugby Profile

1990 births
Living people
New Zealand sportspeople of Samoan descent
People educated at Manurewa High School
Rugby union players from Auckland
Chiefs (rugby union) players
Counties Manukau rugby union players
Connacht Rugby players
Expatriate rugby union players in Ireland
New Zealand rugby union players
New Zealand expatriate rugby union players
New Zealand expatriate sportspeople in Ireland
Irish people of Samoan descent
Ireland international rugby union players
Rugby union centres
British & Irish Lions rugby union players from New Zealand
British & Irish Lions rugby union players from Ireland
New Zealand expatriate sportspeople in Malaysia
Naturalised citizens of Ireland